The 1959 Rice Owls football team represented Rice University during the 1959 NCAA University Division football season. The Owls were led by 20th-year head coach Jess Neely and played their home games at Rice Stadium in Houston, Texas. They competed as members of the Southwest Conference, finishing in sixth.

Schedule

References

Rice
Rice Owls football seasons
Rice Owls football